Garamani  is a village development committee in Jhapa District in the Province No. 1 of south-eastern Nepal. At the time of the 1991 Nepal census it had a population of 15,612 people living in 2755 individual households.

References

Populated places in Jhapa District